Erika Vázquez Morales (born 16 February 1983), known simply as Erika, is a former Spanish footballer who played as a forward, mainly for Athletic Bilbao where she set club records for most appearances and goals. Between 2003 and 2016, she played for the Spain national team and has also played for the Basque Country national team.

Club career
With 240 goals for the club in the Primera División (women) and 18 more in three UEFA Women's Champions League campaigns she is Athletic Bilbao's all-time top scorer and appearance maker, overtaking the mark of 413 in the latter count set by Eli Ibarra in 2022, a few months before retiring on 423 aged 39 (however, Ibarra won five league championships compared to three for Vázquez).

Her 17 seasons at Lezama was also the most time with the club for a female player across its 20-year history, notwithstanding the year she spent with Espanyol in the 2010–11 season in which the Catalan club finished runners-up in both the league and the Copa de la Reina – Vázquez never won that competition, losing in one earlier final with Lagunak as a teenager in 2000 (by coincidence, one of her opponents that day was Vanesa Gimbert who retired alongside her as a teammate in Bilbao 22 years later) and two subsequent finals with Athletic in 2012 and 2014.

International career
She played for Spain since the 2005 UEFA Women's Championship qualification.
In June 2013, national team coach Ignacio Quereda confirmed Erika as a member of his 23-player squad for the UEFA Women's Euro 2013 finals in Sweden. She was also part of Spain's squad at the 2015 FIFA Women's World Cup in Canada.

International goals

Honours
Athletic Bilbao
 Primera División: 2004–05, 2006–07, 2015–16

Lagunak
Primera Nacional (second tier): 2002–03

References

External links
 
 
 Profile at Athletic Bilbao
 

1983 births
Living people
Footballers from Pamplona
Spanish women's footballers
Women's association football forwards
SD Lagunak (women) players
Athletic Club Femenino players
RCD Espanyol Femenino players
Primera División (women) players
Spain women's youth international footballers
Spain women's international footballers
2015 FIFA Women's World Cup players
Athletic Bilbao non-playing staff